Donaldson, West Virginia may refer to the following communities in the U.S. state of West Virginia:
Donaldson, Hampshire County, West Virginia
Donaldson, Webster County, West Virginia